The V-hull is a type of vehicle armor design used on wheeled armored personnel carriers (APCs), infantry mobility vehicles, infantry fighting vehicles (IFVs) and MRAPs. The design originated in the 1970s with vehicles such as the iconic Casspir used extensively during the South African Border War,  Leopard security vehicle used in the Rhodesian Bush War and South African armored vehicle company Land Systems OMCs and Buffels.

Design
The purpose of V-hulls is to increase vehicle and crew survivability by deflecting an upward directed blast from a landmine (or Improvised Explosive Device) away from the vehicle, while also presenting a sloped armor face. By presenting its armor at an angle, it increases the amount of material a ballistic projectile must pass through in order to penetrate the vehicle, and increases the chance of deflection.

V-hulls are incorporated in armored vehicle designs in several different ways. Many vehicles, such as the BAE Systems RG-33 incorporate the V-hull into a monocoque chassis, while others, such as the ATF Dingo and International MaxxPro use a body-on-frame chassis, with an armored V-hull crew compartment, and an additional V or semicircular shaped piece protecting the driveline. Others, such as the Cougar H have a V-hull crew compartment, and allow the driveline and suspension components to be sacrificed in an attack, while maintaining the safety of the crew.

Gallery

See also
 MRAP (armored vehicle)

References

Vehicle armour
Armoured warfare
Military technology
Armoured fighting vehicle equipment